Victoria Sauze Valdez (born 21 July 1991) is an Argentinian field hockey player. She plays with the Argentina national field hockey team, winning silver medal at the 2020 Summer Olympics.

Hockey career 
In 2017, Sauze was called into the senior national women's team. She competed in the team that finished fifth at the 2016-17 Hockey World League Final in Auckland.

She won a gold medal at the 2019 Pan American Games.

References

Living people
1991 births
Argentine female field hockey players
South American Games gold medalists for Argentina
South American Games medalists in field hockey
Competitors at the 2018 South American Games
Field hockey players at the 2019 Pan American Games
Pan American Games medalists in field hockey
Pan American Games gold medalists for Argentina
Medalists at the 2019 Pan American Games
Field hockey players at the 2020 Summer Olympics
Olympic field hockey players of Argentina
Olympic silver medalists for Argentina
Medalists at the 2020 Summer Olympics
Olympic medalists in field hockey
21st-century Argentine women